Estonian Rollerskating Federation (abbreviation ERF) is one of the sport governing bodies in Estonia which deals with roller sports (including rollerskating).

ERF is established on 27 January 1993. ERF is a member of International Roller Sports Federation (FIRS) and Estonian Olympic Committee.

References

External links
 

Sports governing bodies in Estonia